Andriy Mykhaylovych Markovych (born 25 June 1995) is a Ukrainian professional football defender.

Club career
Markovych is a product of the Zhydachiv and UFK Karpaty Lviv Youth School Systems. He made his debut for FC Karpaty entering as a second-half substitute against FC Chornomorets Odesa on 10 May 2015 in Ukrainian Premier League.

Nõmme Kalju
On 22 February 2018,  Markovych joined Estonian Meistriliiga club Nõmme Kalju on a one-year loan contract.

In January 2019 he made a 2-year contract with the team.

International career
He also plays for different youth Ukrainian national football representations.

Honours
Nõmme Kalju
 Meistriliiga: 2018
 Estonian Supercup: 2019

References

External links
 
 

1995 births
Living people
Sportspeople from Lviv Oblast
Ukrainian footballers
Association football defenders
Ukrainian Premier League players
Ukrainian First League players
Belarusian Premier League players
Meistriliiga players
FC Karpaty Lviv players
FC Rukh Lviv players
FC Naftan Novopolotsk players
Nõmme Kalju FC players
Ukrainian expatriate footballers
Expatriate footballers in Belarus
Ukrainian expatriate sportspeople in Belarus
Expatriate footballers in Estonia
Ukrainian expatriate sportspeople in Estonia